Pseudokerana is an Indomalayan genus of grass skippers in the family Hesperiidae.
It is a monotypic genus. The single species is Pseudokerana fulgur (de Nicéville, 1894) found in Thailand, Malaysia, Sumatra and Batoe

References

Natural History Museum Lepidoptera genus database

Hesperiinae
Hesperiidae genera